1967–68 FIBA European Champions Cup was the eleventh installment of the European top-tier level professional basketball club competition FIBA European Champions Cup (now called EuroLeague). The Final was held at the Palais des Sports, Lyon, France, on April 11, 1968, and it was won by Real Madrid, who defeated Spartak ZJŠ Brno, by a result of 98–95.

Competition system
24 teams (European national domestic league champions, plus the then current title holders), playing in a tournament system, played knock-out rounds, on a home and away basis. The aggregate score of both games decided the winner.
The eight teams qualified for 1/4 Finals were divided into two groups of four. Every team played against the other three in its group, in consecutive home-and-away matches, so that every two of those games counted as a single win or defeat (point difference being a decisive factor there). In case of a tie between two or more teams after the group stage, the following criteria were used to decide the final standings: 1) one-to-one games between the teams; 2) basket average; 3) individual wins and defeats.
The group winners and runners-up of the 1/4 Finals round qualified for 1/2 Finals. The final was played at a predetermined venue.

First round

|}

Second round

|}

Quarterfinals group stage
The quarterfinals were played with a round-robin system, in which every Two Game series (TGS) constituted as one game for the record.

Semifinals

|}

Final
April 11, Palais des Sports de Gerland, Lyon

|}

Awards

FIBA European Champions Cup Finals Top Scorer
 Miles Aiken ( Real Madrid)

External links
 1967–68 FIBA European Champions Cup
 1967–68 FIBA European Champions Cup
 Champions Cup 1967–68 Line-ups and Stats

EuroLeague seasons
FIBA